Versus Me is a four-piece American metalcore band from Janesville, Wisconsin, that formed in 2014.  A year later they released their debut single "(A)Tension" featuring Craig Mabbit from Escape the Fate in 2015 with a music video that quickly gained popularity for them.

Background 

Versus Me is the product of four musicians from various Midwest and southeastern metalcore and screamo bands, coming together to share a common passion and vision for music. The group is made up of the Milbrandt brothers, James and Lee, who were previously the guitarist and bassist of Serianna (formed in Wisconsin), Dustin Hansen (Isles of Aura) and J.J. Johnson (Call Upon the Sovereign). Former members include: Patrick Thompson, the co-founding guitarist for Alesana (officially formed in North Carolina), Clint Greendeer who previously performed with Guardians (formed in Wisconsin), and Dustin Helgestad who previously performed with Crossing The Delaware (formed in Wisconsin).

Musical influence 

Versus Me's musical influences come from a mix of bands like A Day to Remember, Pierce the Veil, The Devil Wears Prada, Born of Osiris, Copeland, Acceptance, Maroon 5, and each individual members diverse background from previous projects to create a sound that compliments bands like Bring Me the Horizon and Asking Alexandria.

Members 

 James Milbrandt – vocals
 Dustin Hansen – guitar
 Lee Milbrandt – bass guitar
 J.J. Johnson – drums

Former
 Patrick Thompson – guitar, vocals
 Clint Greendeer – guitar
 Dustin Helgestad – drums

Discography

Albums 
 Changes (2016)
 Continuous (2019)

Singles 
 "(A)Tension" featuring Craig Mabbit (2014)
 "An American Tale" featuring Josh Napert (2015)
 "An American Tale" (acoustic) (2015)
 "PartyBlood" (2015)
 "EXP" (2017)
 "Real Life Monsters" featuring Eric Vanlerberghe (2017)
 "Snake Cake" (2017)
 "Left Here" (2018)
 "Shout" (2018)
 "Not Going Back" (2018)
 "Far Behind" (2019)
 "Heavy Breathing" (2019)
 "Give Me a Reason" (2019)
 "Cruel Summer" (Taylor Swift Cover) (2019)
 "Give Me a Reason" (acoustic) (2019)
 "Violence" (2020)
 "Down" (2021) – No. 37 Mainstream Rock Songs
 "Terrified" (2022) – No. 32 Mainstream Rock Songs

Videography

Tours and festivals

References

External links 
 Versus Me - Facebook

Musical groups established in 2013
Metalcore musical groups from Wisconsin
2013 establishments in Wisconsin